Gareth Keith Taylor (born 25 February 1973) is a football manager and former player who is the head coach of Manchester City Women.

He began his career as a defender at Bristol Rovers, having left the Southampton youth team in 1991. After loan spells with non-league sides Gloucester City and Weymouth, he was converted into a striker. He then spent the 1995–96 season with Crystal Palace (who paid £1.25 million for his services), before a two-year spell with Sheffield United. He transferred to Manchester City in 1998 for a £400,000 fee, and was loaned out to Port Vale, Queens Park Rangers, and Burnley. He moved permanently to Burnley in 2001, and joined Nottingham Forest for a £500,000 fee two years later. In 2006, he was loaned out to Crewe Alexandra, before signing with Tranmere Rovers. In 2008, he switched to Doncaster Rovers, and joined Conference club Wrexham a year later, following a brief spell on loan at Carlisle United. He retired as a player in September 2011, having scored 135 goals in 642 appearances across all competitions. In addition to an eighteen-year career in the Football League he also enjoyed a nine-year international career. He won a total of fifteen caps for Wales, and scored once, in a friendly against Scotland. He was eligible for the national side because of his Welsh-born father.

He went on to coach at Manchester City before he was appointed manager of the club's women's team in May 2020. He led the team to the FA Cup title in 2020 and League Cup title in 2022.

Club career

Bristol Rovers
Born in Weston-super-Mare, Somerset, Taylor started his career with Southampton, but failed to make any first team appearances and was released. Second Division Bristol Rovers then signed him in 1991. Over the course of the 1991–92 season he was loaned to Gloucester City, where he played two games without scoring. He made his Football League debut as a centre-back in a 6–1 defeat at Cambridge United in February 1992. He then had another loan spell, this time to Weymouth in 1992–93, where he made five appearances without scoring.

He did not play again until the first match of the 1994–95 campaign, by which time manager John Ward had converted him into a striker. His height meant he was a good target man and was exceptional in the air, scoring twelve goals (most of them headers) in his first full season alongside Marcus Stewart and Paul Miller in attack. His brace against Brentford on the final day ensured a Second Division play-off spot. After a tense away goals victory over Crewe Alexandra in the semi-final, Rovers made it to Wembley, though they lost 2–1 to Huddersfield Town.

Crystal Palace
After four goals in seven games at the start of the following season, he was transferred to Crystal Palace for an initial £750,000 rising to an eventual £1.25 million on 27 September 1995. He failed to make an impact at the London outfit and only managed 23 appearances and two goals.

Sheffield United
He was soon released by Palace, and was signed by Sheffield United on 7 March 1996. In 1996–97 he scored twelve goals, helping the club to the play-off final, though ironically United lost out 1–0 to Crystal Palace. The following season he hit ten goals. United again reached the play-offs, though went out to Sunderland at the semi-final stage.

Manchester City
He was bought by Manchester City for £400,000 in November 1998. In 1998–99 he again found himself in the play-offs, he was a late substitute in the final, replacing Lee Crooks. The 1999–2000 season saw a second successive promotion for the "Blues". Taylor didn't play a huge role in the promotion though, instead he joined Port Vale on a one-month loan in January 2000. In March, he joined Queens Park Rangers on loan until the end of the season. Stockport County were interested in his signature in November 2000, though nothing was to come out of it. He came close to a move to Sheffield Wednesday in January 2001, but the £100,000 deal did not go through. Instead he joined Burnley on loan the following month. That season he never made a Premier League game for Man City.

Burnley
He scored his first Burnley goal on 13 March in a 1–0 win at Watford; five days later the loan deal was extended. The loan deal lasted until the end of the season, Taylor having scored four goals in fifteen appearances. He moved to Turf Moor on a free transfer in July 2001, signing a three-year deal. Taylor had a highly successful 2001–02 season with the Lancashire club, scoring sixteen goals despite suffering an ankle injury in January. He also performed in the 2002–03 season, bagging seventeen goals in close to fifty games.

Nottingham Forest

He was targeted by Norwich City, but instead was bought by Paul Hart's Nottingham Forest for £500,000. At the beginning of the 2003–04 season, following his recovery from a serious eye injury sustained while still at Burnley, he became a regular in the side when David Johnson broke his leg. Forest's fortunes took a downturn largely caused by a mass exodus of players during the previous summer. Taylor played a big part in the recovery with some very important goals. His first goal for Forest came against his former club Burnley at Turf Moor, where Nottingham Forest won 3–0. He missed the end of the season with a knee injury that required surgery.

In the unfortunate 2004–05 season which resulted in relegation, he was made captain by Gary Megson and was top scorer with eleven goals. For the second year running he underwent a knee operation at the end of the season. Shortly into the 2005–06 season, following a string of disappointing performances from the team, and with rumours that Megson had a deteriorating relationship with the players, he was stripped of the captaincy. With striker Grant Holt being signed to replace him, Taylor suddenly fell out of favour and was allowed to go on loan to Crewe Alexandra in January 2006, where he enjoyed some success but was unable to prevent them too suffering relegation. Taylor's contract at Nottingham Forest expired in the summer of 2006; the club decided against renewing it and he was released. Dario Gradi offered him a deal at Crewe, though as expected Taylor signed elsewhere.

Tranmere Rovers
At the end of June 2006, he joined Tranmere Rovers on a two-year contract, scoring nine goals in all competitions in his debut season. He broke his jaw at the start of the season, spending a month on the sidelines. Upon his recovery he said: "I'm enjoying my football now, it's a great club and I'm really loving life at Tranmere", also giving high praise to manager Ronnie Moore.

Doncaster Rovers
Taylor initially signed for Doncaster Rovers on loan on 31 January 2008, but the deal was made permanent on 6 February. He scored his first goal on 5 April, the first equaliser in a 2–2 draw against Huddersfield Town at the Galpharm Stadium. He helped the club to promotion from the play-offs, though was an unused substitute in the final. The 2008–09 season started poorly for Taylor as he pulled a hamstring. He joined Carlisle United on a month-long loan deal in March 2009. He scored on his debut, in a 2–1 win over Crewe Alexandra on 3 March. He returned to Doncaster at the end of the season, where he was released from his contract on 7 May.

Wrexham
In June 2009, Taylor signed a one-year contract with Dean Saunders' Conference National side Wrexham, leaving the Football League after eighteen years. Taylor got off to an excellent start with his new club, grabbing a brace in a 3–0 win over Eastbourne Borough on 8 August. He finished the season with nine goals in 28 appearances – enough to earn him a fresh contract at the end of the campaign. In 2010–11, the veteran striker hit six goals in 35 appearances. The "Dragons" earned a play-off spot, though were beaten by Luton Town at the play-off semi-final stage. Throughout his time at the Welsh club he began taking his coaching badges, and regularly took charge of the reserve side. He retired in September 2011, and immediately took up coaching at Manchester City.

International career
Taylor is a former Wales international. Born in England, he qualified for the national side through his father who was born in Wales. After a three-year absence he was re-called to the squad in August 2001 for the final two 2002 World Cup qualifiers. He was utilised as a stand-in for John Hartson, who was troubled with injury. He scored his only international goal in a 4–0 friendly victory over Scotland at the Millennium Stadium in 2004.

Coaching career

Manchester City
In September 2011, Taylor was appointed as a coach at former club Manchester City, and was given the task of developing young talent in Dubai. He became the under-16 coach at the City of Manchester Stadium in 2012.

He was appointed the head coach of Manchester City Women on 28 May 2020. Lucy Bronze was the biggest name arrival of his first transfer window. On 1 November 2020, he led City to a 3–1 victory over Everton in the 2020 final of the Women's FA Cup at Wembley Stadium. City finished second in the FA Women's Super League at the end of the 2020–21 season, two points behind Chelsea. They reached the FA Cup semi-finals, where they were also beaten by Chelsea. In the 2020 Women's FA Community Shield, they lost to Chelsea, who also eliminated them from the League Cup at the quarter-final stage. City were also beaten in the Champions League quarter-finals, this time losing to Barcelona.

Taylor won his second trophy in management on 5 March 2022, finally overcoming Emma Hayes's Chelsea in a final, as City won 3–1 with a brace from Caroline Weir and goal from Ellen White. He said the win was a good response after he received "unjustified" following a poor start to the 2021–22 campaign. City also reached the final of the FA Cup, though were beaten 3–2 by Chelsea after extra-time.

He was named as Super League Manager of the Month for February 2023 after guiding the team to victories over Leicester City and Arsenal to extend the club's unbeaten run to eleven matches.

Career statistics

Club

International

Managerial statistics
All competitive games (league, domestic and continental cups) are included.

Honours

Player
Manchester City
Football League Second Division play-offs: 1999
Football League First Division second-place promotion: 1999–2000

Manager
Manchester City Women
Women's FA Cup: 2020; runners-up 2022
FA Women's League Cup: 2022
Individual

 FA Women's Super League Manager of the Month: February 2023

References

1973 births
Living people
People from Weston-super-Mare
Association football utility players
Association football defenders
Association football forwards
Welsh footballers
Wales international footballers
Southampton F.C. players
Bristol Rovers F.C. players
Gloucester City A.F.C. players
Weymouth F.C. players
Crystal Palace F.C. players
Sheffield United F.C. players
Manchester City F.C. players
Port Vale F.C. players
Queens Park Rangers F.C. players
Burnley F.C. players
Nottingham Forest F.C. players
Crewe Alexandra F.C. players
Tranmere Rovers F.C. players
Doncaster Rovers F.C. players
Carlisle United F.C. players
Wrexham A.F.C. players
English Football League players
National League (English football) players
Women's Super League managers
Welsh football managers
Manchester City W.F.C. managers
Association football coaches
Manchester City F.C. non-playing staff